The 1964 United States presidential election in Kansas took place on November 3, 1964, as part of the 1964 United States presidential election. Voters chose seven representatives, or electors, to the Electoral College, who voted for president and vice president.

Kansas was won by incumbent President Lyndon B. Johnson (D–Texas), with 54.09% of the popular vote, against Senator Barry Goldwater (R–Arizona), with 45.06% of the popular vote.

, this is the last time the Democratic candidate won Kansas, as well as the following counties: Allen, Barber, Barton, Bourbon, Clark, Comanche, Cowley, Ellsworth, Franklin, Geary, Gove, Grant, Harvey, Haskell, Kearny, Lane, Lyon, McPherson, Montgomery, Morton, Nemaha, Neosho, Osage, Ottawa, Pratt, Russell, Saline, Sedgwick, Sheridan, Sherman, Stanton, Stevens, Thomas and Trego.

Despite not even reaching 55% of the vote, this remains the best Democratic presidential performance in Kansas history.

Results

Results by county

See also
 United States presidential elections in Kansas

References

Kansas
1964
1964 Kansas elections